2nd parallel may refer to:

2nd parallel north, a circle of latitude in the Northern Hemisphere
2nd parallel south, a circle of latitude in the Southern Hemisphere